Automotodróm Slovakia Ring is a  motor racing circuit in Orechová Potôň, Dunajská Streda District in Slovakia, approximately  away from Bratislava Airport. It was built between 2008 and 2009.

Description 

New Zealand race car driver Matt Halliday suggested that the rear engine Porsches struggled with Slovakia Ring's long radius corners with much less front aerodynamics than the other cars.

A major feature of the circuit is a prominent hump on one of the straights that causes some cars to fly with the front wheels off the ground. Only one car has flipped over entirely and crashed after going over the hump at a high speed. Prior to start of the 2014 season the hump between turns 2 and 3 was rebuilt.

Major events

FIA GT Championship and Blancpain Sprint Series

 FIA GT3 European Championship

On 21 August 2011, the track hosted the fifth round of the 2011 FIA GT3 European Championship season. Winners of the two 29-lap races were Dominik Baumann and Brice Bosi in the first, and Philippe Giauque and Mike Parisy in the second, both teams driving in Mercedes-Benz SLS AMG. Many cars flew on the second hill.

 FIA GT1 World Championship
On 10 June 2012, the track hosted the fourth round of the 2012 FIA GT1 World Championship season. The winners of the qualifying race were Filip Salaquarda and Toni Vilander in a Ferrari 458 Italia GT3, and the winners of the championship race were Michael Bartels and Yelmer Buurman in a BMW Z4 GT3.

 FIA GT Series
On 18 August 2013, the track hosted the fourth round of the 2013 FIA GT Series season.

 Blancpain Sprint Series
On 24 August 2014, the track hosted the fourth round of the 2014 Blancpain Sprint Series season, the successor of the FIA GT Series.

FIA World Touring Car Championship and Cup 
On 6 February 2012, it was announced that Slovakia Ring will replace the Argentina race in the 2012 World Touring Car Championship calendar. The event took place on 29 April 2012, with Gabriele Tarquini winning the first race in a SEAT León and Robert Huff the second race in a Chevrolet Cruze.

It also hosted the Race of Slovakia in the following 2013 season calendar. The event took place on 28 April 2013, with Gabriele Tarquini winning the first race in a Honda Civic, and Tom Coronel the second race in BMW 320 TC.

The race was featured again as the fourth round of the 2014 season, which took place on 11 May 2014. The winning driver of the first race was Sébastien Loeb in a Citroën C-Elysée, while the second race was cancelled due to heavy rain.

In 2015, the race was pushed forward to 21 June, and the two winners were Yvan Muller and Sébastien Loeb, both in Citroën C-Elysée.

In 2016, it was pulled back to 17 April and the format of the championship was slightly changed, with an opening race with the top grid positions inversed and a second main race with the grid from the qualifying session. The winners were Tiago Monteiro in a Honda Civic in the opening race, and José María López in a Citroën C-Elysée in the main race.

In 2017, the race was not featured in the series calendar.

In 2018, with the new FIA World Touring Car Cup regulations and format, the race was added to the calendar on 7 June, once again as a replacement of the Argentina race. It took place on 13–15 July and the winners were Pepe Oriola in a Cupra León in the first race, and Gabriele Tarquini and Norbert Michelisz in the second and third races, both in Hyundai i30.

In 2019, the race was featured as the third round of the racing calendar, in the weekend 10–12 May. All three races took place on Sunday, as the event ran together with the FIM Endurance World Championship support series. The winners were Frédéric Vervisch (Audi RS3), Néstor Girolami (Honda Civic), and the Chinese driver Ma Qing Hua (Alfa Romeo Giulietta).

ADAC GT Masters 
On 14 and 15 September 2013, the track hosted the seventh round of the 2013 ADAC GT Masters season.

Between 8 and 10 August 2014, the track hosted the fifth round of the 2014 ADAC GT Masters season.

Acceleration 2014 
Between 4 and 6 July 2014, the Slovakia Ring hosted the fifth weekend of Acceleration 2014, a series of festivals combining top class car and bike racing with music and entertainment.

Touring Car Endurance Series 
The first ever 24 hours automobile sport event at the Slovakia Ring was the Hankook 24H SLOVAKIA RING on 15 and 16 June 2016, as part of the Touring Car Endurance Series. The race had a rather close finish. After 24 hours there was just a 20.9 seconds lead for ARC Bratislava by Ferry Monster Autosport. after 2016 Tour Car Endurance Series has not showed back to the event due to low car count.

FIA European Truck Racing Championship 
Between 15 and 16 July 2017, the track will host the fourth round of the FIA European Truck Racing Championship.

The track was featured again in the 2018 season, between 14 and 15 July, as a support series of the FIA World Touring Car Cup.

The track was featured again in the 2022 season, between 2 and 3 July for the 3rd round of the FIA European Truck Racing Championship

Events

 Current
 May: Porsche Sprint Challenge Central Europe
 June: FIA European Truck Racing Championship, TCR Eastern Europe Trophy, ACCR Formula 4 Championship
 August: Histo-Cup Austria

 Former
 Acceleration 2014 2014 Acceleration at Slovakia Ring (2014)
 ADAC GT Masters (2013–2014)
 Blancpain GT Series (2014)
 EuroBOSS Series (2010)
 FIA GT Series (2013)
 FIA GT1 World Championship (2012)
 FIM Endurance World Championship 8 Hours of Slovakia Ring (2017–2019)
 Sidecar World Championship (2018)
 TCR Europe Touring Car Series (2021)
 Touring Car Endurance Series Hankook 24H Slovakia Ring (2016)
 World Touring Car Championship FIA WTCC Race of Slovakia (2012–2016)
 World Touring Car Cup FIA WTCR Race of Slovakia (2018–2020)

Parameters 
 Track length:  (for Variant 4) (for Variant 4b)
 Track width: 
 Finishing point length: 
 Finishing point width: 
 Accelerating testing track length: 
 Accelerating testing track width:

Lap records 

The qualifying and race lap records at the Automotodróm Slovakia Ring are listed as:

Qualifying lap records

Race lap records

Notes

References

External links 

Motorsport venues in Slovakia
Dunajská Streda District
Buildings and structures in Trnava Region
Tourist attractions in Trnava Region
World Touring Car Championship circuits